Bedab (also Romanized as Bedāb) is a village in Ahmadsargurab Rural District, Ahmadsargurab District, Shaft County, Gilan Province, Iran. At the 2006 census, its population was 810, in 219 families.

References 

Populated places in Shaft County